Franziska van Almsick (born 5 April 1978) is a German swimmer. She won her first Olympic medals in 1992 at the Barcelona Olympic Games aged 14.

Her career began at the SC Dynamo Berlin. She has the distinction of having the most career Olympic medals, ten, without ever winning a gold medal. She ended her career at the Athens Olympic Games in 2004.

In 1993, she was named by Swimming World magazine as the Female World Swimmer of the Year.

She has two sons, born in 2006 and 2013. The family's residence is Heidelberg.

See also 
 List of German records in swimming
 List of multiple Summer Olympic medalists
 List of multiple Olympic medalists at a single Games
 World record progression 50 metres freestyle
 World record progression 100 metres freestyle
 World record progression 200 metres freestyle
 Sport in Berlin

References

External links 
 
 
 

1978 births
Living people
Swimmers from Berlin
People from East Berlin
German female swimmers
German female freestyle swimmers
Olympic swimmers of Germany
Swimmers at the 1992 Summer Olympics
Swimmers at the 1996 Summer Olympics
Swimmers at the 2000 Summer Olympics
Swimmers at the 2004 Summer Olympics
World record setters in swimming
Olympic silver medalists for Germany
Olympic bronze medalists for Germany
Olympic bronze medalists in swimming
German female butterfly swimmers
World Aquatics Championships medalists in swimming
Medalists at the FINA World Swimming Championships (25 m)
European Aquatics Championships medalists in swimming
Medalists at the 1992 Summer Olympics
Medalists at the 1996 Summer Olympics
Medalists at the 2000 Summer Olympics
Medalists at the 2004 Summer Olympics
Olympic silver medalists in swimming
Recipients of the Order of Merit of Berlin
20th-century German women
21st-century German women